, literally Human-Steered Torpedo Kaiten, is a 1955 black-and-white Japanese film directed by Shūe Matsubayashi.

Cast 
 Eiji Okada as Asakura
 Isao Kimura as Tamai
 Keiko Tsushima as Manabe
 Taiji Tonoyama as Ueno
 Toshio Takahara as Kwamura
 Ken Utsui as Murase

References

External links 
 

Japanese black-and-white films
1955 films
Films directed by Shūe Matsubayashi
Films scored by Akira Ifukube
Japanese war films
1955 war films
1950s Japanese films